Jarosław Kubicki (born 7 August 1995) is a Polish professional footballer who plays as a midfielder for Lechia Gdańsk in the Ekstraklasa.

Career statistics

Club

1 Including Polish SuperCup.

Honours
Lechia Gdańsk
Polish Cup: 2018–19
Polish Super Cup: 2019

References

External links
 
 

1995 births
Living people
Polish footballers
Poland youth international footballers
Poland under-21 international footballers
Lechia Gdańsk players
Zagłębie Lubin players
Ekstraklasa players
I liga players
People from Lubin
Association football midfielders